Neil Barnett Shulman is an American doctor and medical writer, who is Associate Professor in the School of Medicine at Emory University. He has conducted and published clinical research on hypertension and is the co-founder of the International Society on Hypertension in Blacks. He is the author of many books promoting medical literacy for both adults and children, as well as humor and children's books. He is the associate producer of the 1991 film Doc Hollywood, based on one of his books.

Medical career
Shulman graduated from Emory University School of Medicine in 1971, after which he began teaching at the same institution. He has conducted research and published a variety of papers on the field of hypertension, funded at the level of around $8 million by the National Institutes of Health.

In 1986 Shulman co-founded the International Society of Hypertension in Blacks (ISHIB) together with Wilbur Dallas Hall and Elijah Sanders. Through its annual research conference, this society brings the latest approaches to cardiovascular disease prevention and treatment to health care professionals in the West and the Third World. Shulman also helped launch ISHIB's peer-reviewed quarterly journal, Ethnicity & Disease, and the Heart to Heart Program which brought children from developing countries to the United States for life-saving heart surgery.

Shulman is chairman of the board of Patch Adams’ Gesundheit! Institute, and an advisory board member of Global H.E.E.D., a non-profit organization founded by former students of Emory University, Zain Ahmed '08C and Sonny Bandyopadhyay '07C to promote development, medicine, and public health in Guatemala.

Healthcare activist
Shulman is a patient advocate who has taken an active role on behalf of healthcare consumers and patients with limited access to care. Shulman founded the Medical Volunteerism Conference in 2010 which met at Emory University with over 2,000 international attendants in that year. In 2011 the summit was held again, this time called the Global Health and Humanitarian Summit. He played an active role on behalf of patients affected by the closing of the dialysis clinic at Grady Memorial Hospital in Atlanta, GA, which ultimately led to a favorable outcome for the affected patients. He was a key contributor to the 2013 Global Health and Humanitarian Summit. held at Emory University on April 12, 2013 - April 14, 2013.

Author, filmmaker, website developer
Shulman has authored and co-authored many books on medical topics, as well as consumer medical primers for adults and children, and children's books. He self-publishes children's and humor books through his own company, Rx Humor.

In 1991 his book What? Dead…Again? was made into a feature film called Doc Hollywood, starring Michael J. Fox; Shulman was an associate producer on the film. He also produced, co-directed, co-wrote and co-starred in the independent feature film Who Nose? (Wet Sock Productions, 2006).

In 1999 he developed his book Your Body’s Red Light Warning Signals: Medical tips that may save your life into an interactive consumer website (www.redlightwarningsignals.com). In 2007 he developed his children's book What’s in a Doctor’s Bag? into an interactive website (www.whatsinadoctorsbag.com).

Shulman is also a comic performer on the subjects of humor and medical literacy. He often performs in fundraisers for free clinics and other charitable ventures.

Personal 
Shulman married actress Zoe Haugo in October 2008. They have one son, Miles, born September 2006.

Selected bibliography

Books
 (with W. Dallas Hall and Elijah Saunders)
 (with Elijah Sanders and W. Dallas Hall)

 (with Letitia Sweitzer)

 (with Letitia Sweitzer)

 (with Sibley Fleming)
 (with Sibley Fleming)
 (with Edmond Moses and Daniel Adame)
 (with P. K. Beville)
 (with Todd Stolp and Robin Voss)
 (with Kristin Anlage)

 (with James W. Reed and Charlene Shucker)
 (with Edmund S. Kim)
 (with Rowena Sobczyk)

 (with Allison Anderson)

 (with Eric Spencer)
 (with Michael Silverman and Adam G. Golden)

Articles
 (with Gary Cutter, Robert Daugherty, Mary Sexton, George Pauk, Mary Jordan Taylor and Myra Tyler)
 (with B. Martinez, D. Brogan, A. A. Carr, and C. G. Miles)
 (with Barry R. Davis, Herbert G. Langford, M. Donald Blaufox, J. David Curb, and B. Frank Polk)

 (with Michael J. Klag, Paul K. Whelton, Bryan L. Randall, James D. Neaton, Frederick L. Brancati, Charles E. Ford, and Jeremiah Stamler)

Book chapters
"Medical Regimen Adherence and Appointment Compliance" in Hypertension management: Clinical practice and therapeutic dilemmas, Gary L. Wolman and Wilbur Dallas Hall, eds. 1988: Year Book Medical Publishers, pp. 398–405. .

References

External links
Personal website
"Your Body's Warning Signs" website
"What's in a Doctor's Bag?" interactive website
 U.S. Patent 5,373,668: Cottage with removable roof by Neil B. Shulman et al.
 U.S. Patent 7,004,507: Combined poster book system and method by Neil Barnett Shulman

Emory University faculty
American medical writers
Jews and Judaism in Georgia (U.S. state)
Writers from Georgia (U.S. state)
Living people
Year of birth missing (living people)